The Greatest Generation is a demographic cohort born between the early 1900s and the 1920s.

Greatest Generation may also refer to:
The Greatest Generation (book), a 1998 book by Tom Brokaw
The Greatest Generation (album), an album by the Wonder Years
The Greatest Generation (podcast), a podcast about Star Trek
"The Greatest Generation", a song by All That Remains from the album The Order of Things